Watton could refer to:

Places
England
Watton, Devon
Watton, Dorset
Watton, East Riding of Yorkshire
Watton, Norfolk
Watton-at-Stone, Hertfordshire
United States
Watton, Michigan

People with the surname
Andrew Watton, a stage name of Steven Blum (born 1960), American voice actor
Ben Watton (born 1995), English actor
Chris Watton (born 1977), American football player
Ellie Watton (born 1989), British field hockey player
James Watton (1915–1995), Canadian bishop
Jim Watton (born 1936), English footballer
Jonathan Watton, Canadian actor
Laura Watton (born 1979), British manga artist
Ron Watton (born c. 1932), Canadian football player
Gregory Watton (born 1978), Songwriter

Other 
The Watton, a street in Brecon, Wales, the location of The Barracks, Brecon

See also 
Watton's Green, Essex, England
Whatton-in-the-Vale